New Hope is an unincorporated community in Lincoln County, in the U.S. state of Missouri.

History
New Hope was platted in 1837. A post office called New Hope was established in 1837, and remained in operation until 1908.

References

Unincorporated communities in Lincoln County, Missouri
Unincorporated communities in Missouri